Ivor Lingard (birth registered first ¼ 1942) is an English former professional rugby league footballer who played in the 1960s and 1970s, and coached in the 1970s.

Background
Ivor Lingard's birth was registered in Lower Agbrigg district, Wakefield, West Riding of Yorkshire, England.

Playing career

County Cup Final appearances
Ivor Lingard played  in Featherstone Rovers' 0-10 defeat by Halifax in the 1963 Yorkshire County Cup Final during the 1963–64 season at Belle Vue, Wakefield on Saturday 2 November 1963.

Club career
Ivor Lingard made his début for Featherstone Rovers on Wednesday 19 April 1961, and he played his last match for Featherstone Rovers during the 1963–64 season.

Genealogical information
Ivor Lingard is the cousin of the father of the rugby league footballer; Craig Lingard, i.e. first cousin once removed.

References

External links
Statistics at rugbyleagueproject.org
 (archived by web.archive.org) Statistics at stats.rleague.com
 (archived by web.archive.org) Statistics at nrlstats.com.au
Trading Card featuring Ivor Lingard at dansnrlcollectables.com

1942 births
Living people
English rugby league coaches
English rugby league players
Featherstone Rovers players
Parramatta Eels players
Rugby league players from Wakefield
Rugby league five-eighths
Rugby league halfbacks
Date of birth missing (living people)